The 2010–11 Iraqi Elite League (known as the Asiacell Elite League for sponsorship reasons) was the 37th edition of the competition. The name of the league was changed from Iraqi Premier League to Iraqi Elite League. The season began on 26 November 2010, and ended on 15 August 2011. Duhok were the defending champions.

The season's final was won by Al-Zawraa after defeating Erbil on penalties. This was their 12th title.

Group stage

North Group

Results

South Group

Results

Championship play-off

|-
!colspan="3"|Third place match

|-
!colspan="3"|Final

Third place match

Final

Match officials
Assistant referees:
Luay Subhi
Mohammed Khalaf

Match rules
90 minutes.
30 minutes of extra-time if necessary.
Penalty shootout if scores still level.

Final positions

Season statistics

Top scorers

Hat-tricks

Notes
4 Player scored 4 goals

Awards
Muthana Khalid of Al-Quwa Al-Jawiya was chosen as the Player of the Season. Mohammed Saad of Al-Zawraa came in second place and Mahdi Karim of Erbil came in third.

References

External links
 Iraq Football Association

Iraqi Premier League seasons
1
Iraq